Vasilios Magginas (22 October 1949 – 6 March 2015) was a Greek politician, member of the Greek Parliament for the New Democracy for the Aetolia-Acarnania constituency and government minister.

He was from Astakos, Aetolia-Acarnania, and was elected MP with New Democracy in all the general elections from 1993 to 2007.

He held the following government posts:
 Spokesman for the government led by Constantine Mitsotakis from 1992 until 1993
Minister of Employment in 2007

Magginas resigned as a minister on 15 December 2007 after facing negative publicity over allegations he employed illegal, uninsured immigrants at his holiday residence.

References

External links
 

1949 births
2015 deaths
Greek MPs 1993–1996
Greek MPs 1996–2000
Greek MPs 2000–2004
Greek MPs 2004–2007
Greek MPs 2007–2009
New Democracy (Greece) politicians
Labour ministers of Greece
Government ministers of Greece
People from Astakos